Daisy Town is a Lucky Luke adventure written by Goscinny with Morris and illustrated by Morris. It was originally published in French in the year 1983 and in English, by Cinebook in 2016. The comic is an adaptation of the 1971 film Daisy Town.

Summary 
A young town in the Far West, Daisy Town, attracts many criminals who spread fear and chaos in its streets. Barely arrived in town, and preceded by his reputation, Lucky Luke agrees to take on the role of sheriff in order to combat the crime. Shortly after having fulfilled this task with flying colors, the Dalton brothers arrive and decide to make this city their own, and for that they would resort to numerous ploys essentially aimed at terrorizing the population. They are however systematically defeated by Luke, who ends up driving them out of the city, covered in tar and feathers. It is then that the Daltons are captured by the Indians. Seizing the opportunity, Joe Dalton then tries to inspire the Indian chief's hatred of Daisy Town, so that he digs up the hatchet. The Indians therefore decide to go into battle against the city, while keeping the Daltons prisoners. Lucky Luke decides to take matters into his own hands to defend Daisy Town, and the intervention of the cavalry (just in time) makes it possible to stop the fight and make the Indians flee. The story ends with the discovery of gold in the mountains; gold towards which all the inhabitants rush, making Daisy Town a ghost town.

Characters 

 The Daltons: Joe, William, Jack and Averell. They try to have an important position to direct the city, but are chased out by Lucky Luke. To take revenge, they go to the Indians so that there is a war between them and the inhabitants of Daisy Town.
 Indians: Start a war against the "pale faces".
 The mayor: Convinces Lucky Luke to stay in his city to keep order.
 Bones: The undertaker, always happy with the disputes that brought him his "clientele".

Notes 
In one panel at the beginning of the album, an error appears in the drawing. Lucky Luke's revolver is no longer in his belt, but he also does not have it in hand.

Panel 23B nods to the album Ghost Town through the teacher from Daisy Town who stops in the middle of a triangle to rush to dig for gold. The Gold Hill school in Plate 17A of Ghost Town presents the same design after it was abandoned for the same reasons. The title of the lesson "The triangle" is however inscribed there.

External links
Lucky Luke official site album index 
Goscinny website on Lucky Luke

Comics by Morris (cartoonist)
Lucky Luke albums
1983 graphic novels
Works by René Goscinny